Qatar competed in the Olympic Games for the first time at the 1984 Summer Olympics in Los Angeles, United States.

Results by event

Athletics
Men's Decathlon 
 Manzour Salah 
 Final Result — 6589 points (→ 21st place)

Football (soccer)
Men's Team Competition:
 Preliminary Round (Group A)
 Qatar – France 2 – 2
 Qatar – Chile 0 – 1
 Qatar – Norway 0 – 2
 Quarter Finals
 → Did not advance
Team Roster:
 ( 1.) Younis Lari
 ( 2.) Mohddeham Alsowaida
 ( 3.) Sultan Waleed
 ( 4.) Yousuf Aladsani
 ( 5.) Mobarak Alali
 ( 6.) Faraj Almass 
 ( 7.) Mubarak Suwaide
 ( 8.) Mohammad Alammari 
 ( 9.) Ahmad Almajed
 (10.) Mubarak Alkhater 
 (11.) Salem Mehaizaa
 (12.) Ali Alsadah
 (13.) Adel Malalla
 (14.) Ibrahim Ahmad
 (15.) Mansoor Bakheet
 (16.) Khalid Almohanedi
 (17.) Issa Almohamadi

References
Official Olympic Reports
sports-reference

Nations at the 1984 Summer Olympics
1984
Olympics